Dicranopalpus fraternus is a species from the genus Dicranopalpus. The species was originally described by Szalay in 1950.

References

Harvestmen